Capital Plaza is a building complex with five high-rise buildings in Abu Dhabi, United Arab Emirates. Capital Plaza is located directly on the Corniche of Abu Dhabi and includes three residential towers, an office tower and a hotel tower.

The property was developed by Reisco; the facility management of the building complex has been carried out by Dussmann Middle East GmbH, a subsidiary of the German Dussmann Group. There are 247 apartments (towers A, B, C) in the building. The hotel tower houses the 283-room Sofitel Abu Dhabi Corniche, which opened in March 2012. The base of the building complex includes the hotel lobby, restaurants and a few shops.

The office tower includes the Middle East's first double-deck elevator with a destination control system.

Buildings
Residential tower A: 39 floors, height 173 meters
Residential tower B: 45 floors, height 210 meters
Residential tower C: 39 floors, height 173 meters
Hotel tower: 37 floors, height 166 meters
Office tower: 34 floors, height 200 meters

See also
List of tallest buildings in Abu Dhabi

References

External links
Capital Plaza Abu Dhabi
Capital Plaza - Emporis

Sofitel
2011 establishments in the United Arab Emirates
Mixed-use developments in the United Arab Emirates
Residential skyscrapers in Abu Dhabi
Skyscraper office buildings in Abu Dhabi
Skyscraper hotels in Abu Dhabi